Terror Universal is an American heavy metal supergroup consisting of current and former members of Soulfly, Upon a Burning Body and Ill Nino. Their first single, "Welcome to Hell", comes from their debut EP, Reign of Terror. The EP was released on February 27, 2015, in Australia and New Zealand via 3 Wise/Sony.

Members 

 Dave Chavarri (Massacre) – drums (2014–present)
 Rob Cisneros (Thrax) – lead guitar (2015–present) rhythm guitar (2014–2015)
 Wacy Jahn (Plague) – vocals (2015–present)
 Salvadore Dominguez (Diabolus 2) – bass, rhythm guitar (2015–present)

Former
 Chad Armstrong (Rott) – vocals (2014–2015)
 Ahrue Luster (Diabolus) – lead guitar (2014–2015) 

Timeline

Discography

Studio albums 
Make Them Bleed (2018)

EPs 
Reign of Terror (2015)

Singles 
 "Welcome to Hell"

References 

American alternative metal musical groups
American industrial metal musical groups
American nu metal musical groups
American groove metal musical groups